Frank Davis (1923-1940) was a 17 year old Boy Scout who was awarded a posthumous Bronze Cross, Scouting's highest gallantry medal, for his bravery during the London Blitz of World War II as a Volunteer Air Raid Precautions Messenger and in rescuing an injured fellow Scout.

Life 
Frank was born in 1923 and lived all his life in Bermondsey, then a London Borough and now part of Southwark.

Death 
Like tens of thousands of other UK Scouts, Frank used his skills and time to help in the war effort. Frank was working as a Messenger, carrying messages by hand between Civil Defence Posts during air raids.

Whilst the original medal commendation has been lost, a contemporary newspaper article describes how Frank and a friend came across a burning incendiary device which had been dropped by a German aircraft on Dockhead, Bermondsey. Whilst trying to cover it with sand, Frank's friend was injured such that Frank carried him back to the Civil Defence post at The Most Holy Trinity Church. Frank then returned to the incendiary bomb to finish extinguishing it when two further high explosive bombs detonated and killed him. His body was found soon after. It was 8 December 1940 and Frank was 17.

Frank's funeral took place on 13 December 1940 at St James' Church Bermondsey in Thurland Road. He was buried later the same day at Nunhead Cemetery in a plot close to where the Commonwealth War Graves Commission memorial now stands at the Limesford Road Entrance.

Bronze Cross Medal Award 
On 5 February 1941, the Scout Association announced Frank would be posthumously decorated with a Bronze Cross, nicknamed "The Scout's VC" and the senior gallantry medal that Scouts can be awarded. The medal was presented at Manor Church, Galleywall Road, Bermondsey by General Sir John Shea to Frank's parents at the same time as a number of other medals were presented to other Bermondsey Scouts.

References 

People from the London Borough of Southwark
1923 births
1940 deaths
British civilians killed in World War II
Deaths by airstrike during World War II